is a Japanese football player. She plays for Urawa Reds. She played for Japan national team.

Club career
Sasaki was born in Sagamihara on January 12, 1993. After graduating from Musashigaoka College, she joined Vegalta Sendai (later Mynavi Vegalta Sendai) in 2013. In 2018, she moved to Urawa Reds.

National team career
On June 2, 2016, Sasaki debuted for Japan national team against United States. She played 8 games for Japan until 2017.

National team statistics

References

External links

Japan Football Association
Urawa Reds

1993 births
Living people
Association football people from Kanagawa Prefecture
Japanese women's footballers
Japan women's international footballers
Nadeshiko League players
Mynavi Vegalta Sendai Ladies players
Urawa Red Diamonds Ladies players
People from Sagamihara
Women's association football defenders